Daniel Restrepo García (born March 24, 2000) is a diver from Colombia. He won a gold medal at the 2019 Pan American Games in Lima, the first Pan American golden medal for Colombia at the sport.

He represented Colombia at the 2020 Summer Olympics in the Men's 3 m springboard event.

References 

 
 

2000 births
Living people
Divers at the 2018 Summer Youth Olympics
Colombian male divers
Divers at the 2019 Pan American Games
Pan American Games medalists in diving
Pan American Games gold medalists for Colombia
Youth Olympic gold medalists for Colombia
Medalists at the 2019 Pan American Games
Olympic divers of Colombia
Divers at the 2020 Summer Olympics
21st-century Colombian people